Abu’l-Faḍl Jaʿfar ibn Ahmad al-Muʿtaḍid (895 – 31 October 932 AD), better known by his regnal name al-Muqtadir bi-llāh ("Mighty in God"), was the eighteenth Caliph of the Abbasid Caliphate from 908 to 932 AD (295–320 AH), with the exception of a brief deposition in favour of al-Qahir in 928.

He came to the throne at the age of 13, the youngest Caliph in Abbasid history, as a result of palace intrigues. His accession was soon challenged by the supporters of the older and more experienced Abdallah ibn al-Mu'tazz, but their attempted coup in December 908 was quickly and decisively crushed. Al-Muqtadir enjoyed a longer rule than any of his predecessors, but was uninterested in government. Affairs were run by his officials, although the frequent change of viziers—fourteen changes of the head of government are recorded for his reign—hampered the effectiveness of the administration. The Abbasid harem, where his mother, Shaghab, exercised total control, also exercised a frequently decisive influence on affairs, and especially on the advancement or dismissal of officials. After a period of consolidation and recovery under his father al-Mu'tadid and older half-brother al-Muktafi, al-Muqtadir's reign marks the onset of rapid decline. The full treasury inherited by al-Muqtadir was quickly emptied, and financial difficulties would become a persistent feature of the caliphal government. Ifriqiya fell to the Fatimids, although the commander-in-chief Mu'nis al-Muzaffar was able to repel their attempts to conquer Egypt as well. Nearer to Iraq, the Hamdanids became autonomous masters of the Jazira and the Qarmatians re-emerged as a major threat, culminating in their capture of Mecca in 929. The forces of the Byzantine Empire, under John Kourkouas, began a sustained offensive into the borderlands of the Thughur and Armenia. As a result, in February 929 a palace revolt briefly replaced al-Muqtadir with his brother al-Qahir. The new regime failed to consolidate itself, however, and after a few days al-Muqtadir was restored. The commander-in-chief, Mu'nis al-Muzaffar, was by then a virtual dictator. Urged by his enemies, al-Muqtadir attempted to get rid of him in 932, but Mu'nis marched with his troops on Baghdad, and in the ensuing battle on 31 October 932 al-Muqtadir was killed.

Birth and background 
The future al-Muqtadir was born on 14 November 895, as the second son of Caliph al-Mu'tadid (r. 892–902). His mother was the Greek slave concubine Shaghab. Al-Mu'tadid was the son of al-Muwaffaq, an Abbasid prince who became the Caliphate's main military commander, and de facto regent, during the rule of his brother, al-Mu'tamid (r. 870–892). Al-Muwaffaq's power relied on his close ties with the ghilmān, the foreign-born "slave-soldiers" that now provided the professional mainstay of the Abbasid army. The ghilmān were highly proficient militarily, but also very expensive, and a potential political danger, as their first priority was securing their pay; alien to the mainstream of Muslim society, the ghilmān had no compunctions about overthrowing a vizier or even a caliph to secure their aims, as demonstrated during the "Anarchy at Samarra" (861–870), when five caliphs succeeded one another.

Caliphal authority in the provinces collapsed during the "Anarchy at Samarra", with the result that by the 870s the central government had lost effective control over most of the Caliphate outside the metropolitan region of Iraq. In the west, Egypt had fallen under the control of Ahmad ibn Tulun, who also disputed control of Syria with al-Muwaffaq, while Khurasan and most of the Islamic East had been taken over by the Saffarids, who replaced the Abbasids' loyal governor Muhammad ibn Tahir. Most of the Arabian peninsula was likewise lost to local potentates, while in Tabaristan a radical Zaydi Shi'a dynasty took power. Even in Iraq, the rebellion of the Zanj slaves threatened Baghdad itself, and further south the Qarmatians were a nascent threat. Until his death in 891, al-Muwaffaq was engaged in a constant struggle to avert complete collapse, but managed to suppress the Zanj and repel the Saffarids.  Upon his death, his son assumed his powers, and when Caliph al-Mu'tamid died in 892, he usurped the throne from his sons. Al-Mu'tadid would prove to be the epitome of the "warrior-caliph", spending most of his reign on campaign. He managed to overthrow the local dynasts who had seized power during the Anarchy and restore control over the Jazira, the frontier towns of the Thughur, and the Jibal, but his attempts to capture Fars and Kirman were unsuccessful. In other areas, however, the fragmentation of the Islamic world continued: the Sajid dynasty was established in Adharbayjan, the Armenian princes became de facto independent, Yemen was lost to a local Zaydi dynasty, and a new radical sect, the Qarmatians, emerged and in 899 seized Bahrayn. His successor, al-Muqtadir's older half-brother al-Muktafi, was a more sedentary figure but continued al-Mu'tamid's policies, and was able to score a major victory over the Qarmatians, and reconquer the Tulunid domains.

All this came at the cost of gearing the state towards war: according to the historian Hugh N. Kennedy, based on a treasury document from the time of al-Mu'tadid's accession, "out of the total expenditure of 7915 dinars per day, some 5121 are entirely military, 1943 in areas (like riding animals and stables) which served both military and non-military and only 851 in areas like the bureaucracy and the harem which can be described as truly civilian (though even in this case, the bureaucrats’ main purpose seems to have been to arrange the payment of the army). It seems reasonable to conclude that something over 80 per cent of recorded government expenditure was devoted to maintaining the army." Paying the army thus became the chief concern of the government, but it became an increasingly difficult proposition as the outlying provinces were lost. The situation was further exacerbated by the fact that in the remaining provinces, semi-autonomous governors, grandees and members of the dynasty were able to establish virtual latifundia, aided by the system of muqāṭa'a, a form of tax farming in exchange for a fixed tribute, which they often failed to pay. Even the revenues of the Sawad, the rich agricultural lands of Iraq, are known to have declined considerably at the time. Nevertheless, through stringent economy, and despite near-constant warfare, both al-Mu'tadid and al-Muktafi were able to leave a full treasury behind. Thus the restored Caliphate at the time of al-Muktafi's death was less than half the size than in its heyday under Harun al-Rashid (r. 786–809), but it remained a powerful and viable state, with an army that, "though it was very expensive, was probably the most effective in the Muslim world", and an almost unchallenged legitimacy as the true successors of Muhammad.

Accession and the revolt of Ibn al-Mu'tazz 

In 908, al-Muktafi fell ill, and was evidently nearing his end. The issue of succession had been left open, and with the Caliph incapacitated, the vizier al-Abbas ibn al-Hasan al-Jarjara'i took it upon himself to seek out a successor. Two different versions are told of the events: Miskawayh reports that the vizier sought the advice of the most important bureaucrats (kuttāb, sing. kātib), with Mahmud ibn Dawud ibn al-Jarrah suggesting the older and experienced Abdallah ibn al-Mu'tazz, but Ali ibn al-Furat—who is usually portrayed as a villain by Miskawayh—proposing instead the thirteen-year-old Ja'far al-Muqtadir as someone weak, pliable, and easily manipulated by the senior officials. The vizier also consulted Ali ibn Isa al-Jarrah, who refused to choose, and Muhammad ibn Abdun, whose opinion has not been recorded. In the end, the vizier concurred with Ibn al-Furat, and on al-Muktafi's death Ja'far was proclaimed as heir and brought to the caliphal palace; when the testament of al-Muktafi was opened, he too had chosen his brother as his successor. A different story is reported by the Andalusi historian Arib, whereby the vizier dithered between the candidacies of Ibn al-Mu'tazz and another older Abbasid prince, Muhammad ibn al-Mu'tamid. The choice of the latter would represent a major political departure, in effect a repudiation of al-Mu'tadid's coup that had deprived the offspring of al-Mu'tamid from power, and of the officials and ghilmān that had underpinned al-Mu'tadid's regime. The vizier indeed inclined towards Muhammad, but the latter prudently chose to await al-Muktafi's death before accepting. Indeed, the Caliph recovered, and was informed that people were discussing both Ibn al-Mu'tazz and Ibn al-Mu'tamid as his possible successors. This worried al-Muktafi, who in the presence of the qāḍīs as witnesses officially nominated Ja'far as his heir, before dying. The two stories highlight different aspects of al-Muqtadir's accession: on the one hand, a cabal of officials choosing a weak and pliable ruler, "a sinister development" that inaugurated one "of the most disastrous reigns in the whole of Abbasid history [...] a quarter of a century in which all of the work of [al-Muqtadir's] predecessors would be undone", while on the other hand, the issue of dynastic succession, and especially the loyalty of al-Mu'tadid's ghilmān to his family, evidently also played an important role.

Al-Muqtadir's succession was unopposed, and proceeded with the customary ceremonies. The full treasury bequeathed by al-Mu'tadid and al-Muktafi meant that the donatives to the troops could easily be paid, as well as reviving the old practice of gifts to the members of the Hashimite families. The new caliph was also able to display his largess, and solicitude for his subjects, when he ordered the demolition of a suq erected by his predecessor near Bab al-Taq, where the merchants were forced to pay rent, instead of being able to offer their wares freely as before. This benefited the poor of the capital. Nevertheless, the intrigues surrounding his accession had not abated. The supporters of Ibn al-Mu'tazz in particular remained determined to get their candidate on the throne. According to Arib, the vizier al-Abbas had been one of the chief conspirators, but had begun to acquiesce to al-Muqtadir's rule, hoping to control him. His increasingly arrogant behaviour spurred the other conspirators on, and on 16 December 908, the Hamdanid commander al-Husayn ibn Hamdan led a group of men that killed the vizier as he was riding to his garden. The conspirators then sought to seize the young caliph as well, but the latter had managed to flee to the Hasani Palace, where he barricaded himself with his supporters. The ḥājib (chamberlain) Sawsan was the driving force behind the loyalists' resistance, urging the commanders Safi al-Hurami, Mu'nis al-Khadim, and Mu'nis al-Khazin, to defend the caliph. Al-Husayn tried the entire morning to gain entrance, but failed; and then abruptly, and without notifying his fellow conspirators, fled the city to his home of Mosul. In the meantime, the other conspirators, led by Mahmud ibn Dawud ibn al-Jarrah, had assembled in a house and proclaimed Ibn al-Mu'tazz as caliph. This had the support of some of the qāḍīs, who regarded al-Muqtadir's accession as illegal, but others were opposed, reflecting the uncertainty and indecision of the conspirators themselves. Along with Ibn Hamdan's departure, this indecision allowed al-Muqtadir's followers to regain the upper hand: Mu'nis al-Khadim led his ghilmān on boats across the Tigris to the house where Ibn al-Mu'tazz and the conspirators had gathered, and dispersed them—Arib records that Mu'nis' troops attacked the assembled supporters of Ibn al-Mu'tazz with arrows, while Miskawayh claims that they fled as soon as the troops appeared.

Whatever the true events, the coup collapsed swiftly. Ali ibn al-Furat, the only one among the leading kuttāb to not have had any contact with the conspirators, was named vizier. Muhammad ibn al-Jarrah remained a fugitive and a price was placed on his head. Ibn al-Furat tried to limit retaliations and several of the prisoners were released, but many of the conspirators were executed. The troops, whose loyalty had been decisive, received another donative equal to that of the accession. The ḥājib Sawsan, however, was soon purged, as he grew arrogant and overbearing: he was arrested by Safi al-Hurami and died under house arrest a few days later.

Reign

The queen-mother Shaghab and the harem

Al-Muqtadir was the first underage Caliph in Muslim history, and as such during the early years of his reign, a regency council (al-sāda, "the masters") was set up, comprising, according to al-Tanukhi, his mother Shaghab, her personal agent (qahramāna) Umm Musa, her sister Khatif, and another former concubine of al-Mu'tadid's, Dastanbuwayh. Saghab, usually known simply as al-Sayyida ("the Lady"), utterly "dominated her son to the exclusion of the other women in his harem, including his wives and concubines"; al-Muqtadir would spend much of his time in his mother's quarters. As a result, government business came to be determined in the private quarters of the sovereign rather than the public palace dominated by the bureaucracy, and Saghab became one of the most influential figures of her son's reign, interfering in the appointments and dismissals of officials, making financial contributions to the treasury, and undertaking charitable activities. Indeed, a common feature of all accounts by medieval sources is that "mentions of al-Muqtadir are indissolubly tied to mentions not only of his viziers, but also of his female household", and this was one of the main points of criticism for subsequent historians. Thus the contemporary historian al-Mas'udi condemned al-Muqtadir's reign as one where "those who had power were women, servants and others", while the Caliph himself "did not concern himself with State affairs", leaving his officials to govern the state. Likewise, the 13th-century chronicler Ibn al-Tiqtaqa, regarded al-Muqtadir as a "squanderer" for whom "matters concerning his reign were run by women and servants, while he was busy satisfying his pleasure". Shaghab in particular is usually portrayed as a "rapacious and short-sighted schemer" by later historians.

Shaghab spent most of her life confined in the harem, where she had her own parallel bureaucracy, with her own kuttāb devoted to both civil and military affairs. Her power was such that when her secretary Ahmad al-Khasibi was appointed vizier in 925 due to her own and her sister's influence, he regretted the appointment, since his post as kātib to the queen-mother was more beneficial to himself. The most important members of her court were the stewardesses or qahramāna, who were free to exit the harem and act as her agents in the outside world. These women wielded considerable influence, especially as intermediaries between the harem and the court; their influence with Shaghab could lead to the dismissal of even the viziers. The first incumbent was one Fatima, who drowned in the Tigris when her boat was caught in a storm. She was followed by Umm Musa, a descendant of one of the Abbasid clan's junior branches. Her plotting for her favourites, the corruption of her family, and her hostility towards the "good vizier" Ali ibn Isa al-Jarrah, who was dismissed due to her machinations in 917, are underlined in the chronicles of the period. However, when she married her niece to Abu'l-Abbas, a grandson of al-Mutawakkil (r. 847–861), her rivals were quick to accuse her of aspiring to overthrow the Caliph and place her nephew on the throne. In 922/3, she was arrested and replaced by Thumal, who tortured Umm Musa, her brother, and her sister, until they had revealed where her treasure—reportedly valued at one million gold dinars—was hidden. Thumal enjoyed a reputation for cruelty; her first master, Abu Dulaf, had used her to punish servants who displeased him. Another qahramāna, Zaydan, was the antithesis of Thumal: her house was used to jail several senior officials after they were dismissed, but it was a comfortable captivity, and she often provided refuge to those persecuted by their political rivals.

Policies and events

The stand that had been made during the last four reigns to stay the decline of the Abbasid power at last came to an end. From al-Muqtadir's reign on, the Abbasids would decline. Yet, at the same time, many names that would become famous in the world of literature and science lived during this and the following reigns. Among the best known are: Ishaq ibn Hunayn (d. 911) (son of Hunayn ibn Ishaq), a physician and translator of Greek philosophical works into Arabic; ibn Fadlan, explorer; al Battani (d. 923), astronomer; al-Tabari (d. 923), historian and theologian; al-Razi (d. 930), a philosopher who made fundamental and lasting contributions to the fields of medicine and chemistry; al-Farabi (d. 950), chemist and philosopher; Abu Nasr Mansur (d. 1036), mathematician; Alhazen (d. 1040), mathematician; al-Biruni (d. 1048), mathematician, astronomer, physicist; Omar Khayyám (d. 1123), poet, mathematician, and astronomer; and Mansur al-Hallaj, a mystic, writer and teacher of Sufism most famous for his self-proclaimed attainment of unity with God (which was misunderstood and disputed as divinity), his poetry, and for his execution for heresy by al-Muqtadir.

By the time of al-Muqtadir's reign, there had been war for some years between the Muslims and the Greeks in Asia, with heavy losses for the most part on the side of the Muslims, many of whom were taken prisoner. The Byzantine frontier, however, began to be threatened by Bulgarian hordes. So the Byzantine Empress Zoe Karbonopsina sent two ambassadors to Baghdad with the view of securing an armistice and arranging for the ransom of the Muslim prisoners. The embassy was graciously received and peace restored. A sum of 120,000 golden pieces was paid for the freedom of the captives. All this only added to the disorder of the city. The people, angry at the success of the "Infidels" in Asia Minor and at similar losses in Persia, complained that the Caliph cared for none of these things and, instead of seeking to restore the prestige of Islam, passed his days and nights with slave-girls and musicians. Uttering such reproaches, they threw stones at the Imam, as in the Friday service he named the Caliph in the public prayers.

Some twelve years later, al-Muqtadir was subjected to the indignity of deposition. The leading courtiers having conspired against him, he was forced to abdicate in favour of his brother al-Qahir, but, after scenes of rioting and plunder, and loss of thousands of lives, the conspirators found that they were not supported by the troops. Al-Muqtadir, who had been kept in safety, was again placed upon the throne. The state's finances fell after this event into so wretched a state that nothing was left with which to pay the city guards. Al-Muqtadir was eventually slain outside the city gate in 320 AH (932 AD).

Al-Muqtadir's long reign had brought the Abbasids to their lowest ebb. Northern Africa was lost and Egypt nearly. Mosul had thrown off its dependence and the Greeks could make raids at pleasure along the poorly protected borders. Yet in the East formal recognition of the Caliphate remained in place, even by those who virtually claimed their independence; and nearer home, the terrible Carmathians had been for the time put down. In Baghdad, al-Muqtadir, the mere tool of a venal court, was at the mercy of foreign guards, who, commanded for the most part by Turkish and other officers of foreign descent, were frequently breaking out into rebellion. Because of al-Muqtadir's ineffective rule, the prestige which his immediate predecessors had regained was lost, and the Abbasid throne became again the object of contempt at home and a tempting prize for attack from abroad.

Family
Al-Muqtadir's only wife was Hurra. She was the daughter of Commander-in-Chief, Badr al-Mut'adidi. He was generous towards her. After his death, she remarried a man of lower status. Al-Muqtadir had numerous concubines. One of his concubines was Zalum. She was a Greek, and the mother of al-Muqtadir's eldest son, the future caliph al-Radi and Prince Harun. Another concubine was Dimna. She was the mother of Prince Ishaq, and the grandmother of the future caliph al-Qadir. Another concubine was Khalub also known as Zuhra. She was a Greek, and was the mother of the future caliph al-Muttaqi. Another concubine was Mash'ala. She was a Slavic, and the mother of the future caliph al-Muti'. Another concubine was Khamrah. She was the mother of Prince Isa, and is described as having been very charitable to the poor and the needy. She died on 3 July 988, and was buried in Rusafah Cemetery. Another concubine was the mother of Prince Ibrahim. Another concubine was the mother of a son, born in 909. She was buried in Rusafah Cemetery. Al-Muqtadir had two daughters. One died in 911, and was buried beside the grave of her grandfather caliph al-Mu'tadid in the Dar of Muhammad bin Abdullah bin Tahir. The second died in 917, and was buried in Rusafah Cemetery.

Children
The children of al-Muqtadir are:
 al-Radi was born on 20 December 909, to the caliph al-Muqtadir and a Greek-born slave concubine named Zalum. He was nominated Heir by his father.
 al-Muttaqi, also known as Abu Ishaq Ibrahim.
 al-Muti', was born in 913/14 as al-Fadl, a son of Caliph al-Muqtadir and a Slavic concubine, Mash'ala.
 Harun ibn al-Muqtadir, was the younger son of al-Muqtadir and Zalum.
 Ishaq ibn al-Muqtadir, He was one of the younger son of al-Muqtadir. He died in March 988.
 Isa ibn al-Muqtadir
 Ibrahim ibn al-Muqtadir, youngest son of al-Muqtadir.

See also
 Ahmad ibn Fadlan, Arab Muslim traveler who wrote an account of al-Muqtadir's embassy to the king of the Volga Bulgars.

References

Sources
 
 
 
 
 
 
 
 
 
 
 
 
 
 
 
 
 
 

895 births
932 deaths
Arab Muslims
Medieval child monarchs
10th-century Abbasid caliphs
Sons of Abbasid caliphs
10th-century Arabs
10th-century rulers in Asia
10th-century rulers in Africa
10th-century murdered monarchs
Arab people of Greek descent
Iraqi people of Greek descent